Apistobuthus pterygocercus (Shield-tailed Scorpion) is a species of scorpion that lives on the Arabian Peninsula. It is a highly venomous species, and is therefore of medical importance. It was first described in Susan Finnegan in 1932.

References

Buthidae
Scorpions described in 1932
Fauna of the Middle East